The Skedaddle Mountains are a mountain range that span southeast Lassen County. The tallest peak in this range is Hot Springs Peak, which stands at 2,333 m (7,654 ft.) tall.

The communities of Belfast, Litchfield, and Wendel are located at or near the edges of this range.

References 

Mountain ranges of Lassen County, California
Mountain ranges of Northern California